This is the list of episodes of the Cartoon Network animated series Camp Lazlo. Except where specifically mentioned in the episode synopses, each half-hour episode consists of two separately titled segments. Throughout its run from 2005 to 2008, the show has aired a total of 61 episodes.

The first episode of Season 4 was chapter four in the Cartoon Network Invaded event, which originally aired on May 25, 2007. This event involved special episodes from The Grim Adventures of Billy & Mandy, Ed, Edd n Eddy, My Gym Partner's a Monkey, Foster's Home for Imaginary Friends, and Camp Lazlo.

Series overview

Episodes

Pilot (2004)
Joe Murray originally created a test pilot episode of Camp Lazlo for Cartoon Network in 2004, entitled "Monkey See, Camping Doo". However, the episode never aired, but was reworked as "Gone Fishin' (Sort of)", which became the pilot instead.

Season 1 (2005)

Season 2 (2005–06)

Season 3 (2006–07)

Where's Lazlo? (2007)

Season 4 (2007)

Season 5 (2007–08)

Shorts (2006–08)
These shorts were featured on television and on the podcasts, and were created without the involvement of the creator, Joe Murray.

Notes

Footnotes

External links
 
 

Lists of American children's animated television series episodes
Lists of Cartoon Network television series episodes
Episodes
2000s television-related lists